Don Brandon Ray (June 7, 1925 – April 16, 2005) was an American television composer.

Career 
Ray worked for CBS for 30 years, composing music for television series including Hawaii Five-O, The Twilight Zone, Rawhide, The Governor & J.J. and Men at Law.

In 1974, Ray was nominated for a Primetime Emmy in the category “Best Music Composition - For a Series, a Single Program of a Series” for the Hawaii Five-O episode “Nightmare in Blue”.

In 2000, Ray wrote the Orchestration Handbook.

Death 
Ray died in April 2005 of an infection at the Santa Monica University in Santa Monica, California, at the age of 79.

References 

1925 births
2005 deaths
American television composers
American composers
People from Santa Maria, California

External links